On Broadway is the debut album by American organist Reuben Wilson, recorded in 1968 and released on the Blue Note label.

Reception
The Allmusic review by Stephen Thomas Erlewine awarded the album 3 stars and stated "On Broadway is a successful groove record, but in comparison to the two albums that followed, it's a little uneven".

Track listing
 "On Broadway" (Leiber, Mann, Stoller, Weil) - 8:17
 "Baby I Love You" (Jimmy Holiday, Ronnie Shannon) - 5:28
 "Ain't That Peculiar" (Moore, Robinson, White, Tarplin) - 6:50
 "Ronnie's Bonnie" (Reuben Wilson) - 10:00
 "Poinciana" (Nat Simon, Bernier) - 9:20

Personnel
Reuben Wilson - organ
Trevor Lawrence - tenor saxophone
Malcolm Riddick - guitar
Tommy Derrick - drums

References

Blue Note Records albums
Reuben Wilson albums
1968 albums
Albums recorded at Van Gelder Studio
Albums produced by Francis Wolff